KCWA (93.9 FM) is a radio station licensed to Loveland, Colorado, United States. It is owned by the WAY-FM Network. Its studios are in Longmont, and its transmitter is on Milner Mountain northwest of Loveland.

References

External links
 

CWA
WAY-FM Network
Radio stations established in 1992